Juan Montalvo, O.P. or Juan de Montalvo (died 1586) was a Roman Catholic prelate who served as Bishop of Cartagena (1578–1586).

Biography
Juan Montalvo was born in Arévalo, Spain and ordained a priest in the Order of Preachers.
On 6 Oct 1578, he was appointed during the papacy of Pope Gregory XIII as Bishop of Cartagena.
In 1579, he was consecrated bishop.
He served as Bishop of Cartagena until his death on 10 Sep 1586.

References

External links and additional sources
 (for Chronology of Bishops) 
 (for Chronology of Bishops) 

16th-century Roman Catholic bishops in New Granada
Bishops appointed by Pope Gregory XIII
Roman Catholic bishops of Cartagena in Colombia
1586 deaths